Tu Veneno is the second studio album by Uruguayan singer and actress Natalia Oreiro.

Background 
Natalia Oreiro pursued her music career with her second album, Tu Veneno, and presentations in "Gala de la Hispanidad", "Gala de Murcia" (both in Spain) and "Festival de la Calle 8" in Miami. Her most important appearance was in the prestigious Latin television show Sábado Gigante Internacional, hosted by Don Francisco. Natalia's mayor achievement at this time was her music performance in Chile at the Viña del Mar Festival in 2001, for which she was crowned Queen of that event. The album scored a Latin Grammy nomination for Best Pop Female Vocal Album, but lost to Christina Aguilera's Mi Reflejo. More than 3,600,000 copies of this album was sold worldwide.

Release
The single of the same name as the CD came out in Argentina 26 June 2000. Immediately became a hit number one in the charts. The single was filmed a video clip as a promo on the occasion of the CD. CD Tu veneno published in Argentina 8 August 2000.

Singles
The album's first two singles were Tu Veneno and Basta De Ti which peaked at number 7 and 19 in Spain respectively.

Track listing

Personnel
Credits for Tu Veneno  adapted from Allmusic:

 Alex Acuña – Guest Artist
 Gustavo Borner – Engineer, Recorder
 Pablo Durand – Arranger, producer
 Benny Faccone – Engineer, Recorder
 Yoad Nevo – Arranger
 Carlos Nieto – Engineer, Recorder
 Natalia Oreiro – Lead vocals
 Diego Ortells – Arranger
 Fernando López Rossi – Composer
 Jess Sutcliffe – Engineer, Recorder

Official versions and remixes 
 "Tu Veneno" (Versión Karaoke) (3:00)
 "Tu Veneno" (Remix) (2:33)
 "Basta de Tí" (Radio Dance Remix) (3:20)
 "Basta de Tí" (Extended Dance Remix) (4:17)

Charts

Certifications

Release history

References

External links

 Natalia Oreiro Official Site

Natalia Oreiro albums
2001 albums